Augusto Maccario (30 April 1890 – 16 October 1927) was an Italian long-distance runner who competed at the 1920 Summer Olympics,

References

External links
 

1890 births
1927 deaths
Athletes (track and field) at the 1920 Summer Olympics
Italian male long-distance runners
Olympic athletes of Italy